= Remember The Roses =

- Short story by Avery Taylor
- Country: England
- Language: English
- Genres: Horror, short story, mystery

Publication
- Published in: England, India
- Publisher: Frank Bros. & Co.
- Publication date: 1967

"Remember The Roses" is a short story by Avery Taylor. It is a mixture of mystery, love, and horror. It was set during the Second World War and originally published in England in 1967 by a British publisher. Later it was published in India by Frank Bros. & Co. in a story book A Treasure Trove of Short

== Plot ==
During the Second World War, Robert, an English agent, comes to rescue Paul Renard, a key member of the French Resistance, who has been taken by the Gestapo and is being held in a prison in Rouen, France. Robert parachutes into a field near Rouen. When he tries to make a contact with a member of the Resistance who lives at 16 Rue de Derriere, Robert is almost captured by the Nazis. A young girl called Jehane le Brun rescues him and helps him to locate and free Renard. When Robert returns to England, no one believes his account of how he returned with Renard. When they all inspect the evidence, Robert finds that Jehane could have been none other than the legendary Maid of Orléans, Joan of Arc, who had fought for France in 1429.
